Ravenstone is a village and civil parish in the unitary authority area of the City of Milton Keynes, Buckinghamshire, England. The 2011 Census recorded the parish population as 209.

History
The toponym is derived from the Old English for "Hrafn's farm".

In 1255 a priory of Augustinian canons was founded in Ravenstone by King Henry III. It was dissolved in 1525 and its lands granted to Cardinal Wolsey; and then in 1544 the Crown seized all of Wolsey's estates including Ravenstone Priory. After changing hands privately a number of occasions, the building was eventually demolished, and today nothing remains standing.

The oldest parts of the Church of England parish church of All Saints are 11th-century. The church includes the tomb of Heneage Finch, 1st Earl of Nottingham. He had the neighbouring almshouses built,  originally six for men and six for women, now combined into six cottages. The original inhabitants had to be single and members of the Church of England, and received a small pension, firewood, and a new cloak every Christmas.

Scheduled monuments and listed buildings
The parish has one scheduled monument (Ravenstone Priory), one grade I listed building (the Church of All Saints) and a further 29 buildings or structured listed at. grade II.

Amenities
The only communal facility in Ravenstone is the village hall. A post office and The Wheatsheaf pub closed in the early 1990s.

Notes

Sources and further reading

External links
Ravenstone Home Page

Civil parishes in Buckinghamshire
Areas of Milton Keynes
Villages in Buckinghamshire